The cabinet of Constantin Bosianu was the government of Romania from 26 January to 14 June 1865.

Ministers
The ministers of the cabinet were as follows:

President of the Council of Ministers:
Constantin Bosianu (26 January - 14 June 1865)
Minister of the Interior, Agriculture, and Public Works: 
Constantin Bosianu (26 January - 14 June 1865)
Minister of Foreign Affairs: 
Nicolae Rosetti-Bălănescu (26 January - 14 June 1865)
Minister of Finance:
Ion Strat (26 January - 14 June 1865)
Minister of Justice and Religious Affairs:
George Vernescu (26 January - 14 June 1865)
Minister of War:
Gen. Savel Manu (26 January - 14 June 1865)
Minister of Control:
(interim) Nicolae Rosetti-Bălănescu (26 January - 14 June 1865)

References

Cabinets of Romania
Cabinets established in 1865
Cabinets disestablished in 1865
1865 establishments in Romania
1865 disestablishments in Romania